Croudace Bay is a suburb of the City of Lake Macquarie in New South Wales, Australia, located  southwest of Newcastle's central business district on the eastern side of Lake Macquarie. It was named after Thomas Croudace a mining engineer for the Scottish-Australian Mining Company. The town has Croudace Bay Sports where rugby league , netball , cricket and tennis are played. In 2016 574 people lived there with the median age of 41. 27.8 5 had No Religion, 25.3% Anglican, 21.0% Catholic, 6.9% United Church and 6.4% Not Stated. 93.2% only speak English at home with 1% speaking Afrikkaans and 0.5% speaking Polish.

References

External links
 History of Croudace Bay (Lake Macquarie City Library)

Suburbs of Lake Macquarie
Bays of New South Wales